WLAS-LP (96.1 FM) was a radio station licensed to Bartow, Florida, United States. The station was owned by Ridge Area Radio Support Group Inc..

The station's license was cancelled and its call sign deleted by the Federal Communications Commission on February 3, 2012. On May 16, 2016, the FCC granted a low power FM radio license to Lasell College Radio, who obtained the call letters WLAS-LP (102.9 FM), Newton, MA.

References

External links
 

LAS-LP
LAS-LP
Radio stations disestablished in 2012
Defunct radio stations in the United States
Radio stations established in 2008
2008 establishments in Florida
2012 disestablishments in Florida
Polk County, Florida

Defunct_religious_radio_stations_in_the_United_States
LAS-LP